Hugo Chapacú (born May 5, 1962) is a former tennis player, who represented Paraguay at the 1988 Summer Olympics in Seoul. There he was defeated in the first round by qualifier Andrei Cherkasov from the Soviet Union. The right-hander reached his highest singles ATP-ranking on October 19, 1987, when he became the number 217 of the world.

External links

1962 births
Living people
Paraguayan male tennis players
Tennis players at the 1988 Summer Olympics
Olympic tennis players of Paraguay
People from Posadas, Misiones
Sportspeople from Misiones Province